Diego Silva (born March 13, 1997) is a footballer who most recently played as a midfielder for Stumptown Athletic in the NISA. Born in Argentina, Silva represents the United States internationally.

Career

Youth
Silva played in his native Argentina with Defensores Del Dorado and later spent two years with Racing Club, before moving to the United States. In the United States, Silva joined the Real Salt Lake academy for three years.

College & Amateur
Silva went to play two years of college soccer at the University of Maryland in 2015 and 2016.

In 2018, Silva spent the season with USL PDL side FC Tucson, making two appearances and tallying two assists.

Silva remained in the USL PDL, now rebranded as USL League Two, in 2019. Initially signing for Ogden City SC, but later moving to Park City Red Wolves, where he made three appearances for the club.

Professional
In July 2019, Silva signed for NISA side Stumptown Athletic ahead of the league's inaugural season.

References

External links
 Profile at University of Maryland Athletics
 Stumptown Athletic profile

1997 births
Living people
Footballers from Buenos Aires
American soccer players
Argentine footballers
United States men's under-20 international soccer players
United States men's youth international soccer players
Argentine emigrants to the United States
Association football midfielders
Maryland Terrapins men's soccer players
FC Tucson players
Stumptown AC players
USL League Two players
National Independent Soccer Association players